The GPR index, derived from Global Property Research, is a stock market index composed of property companies that trade on several global exchanges.

See also
 EPRA index

External links
 www.globalpropertyresearch.com

Global stock market indices
Stock market indices by industry